Harvester is a hyper-converged infrastructure (HCI) free software (Apache license) software, that is intended for use on common servers in e.g. a private cloud (e.g. in own datacenter). Harvester was annonced in 2020 by SUSE.

Harvester uses the following software: openSUSE (OS), KubeVirt (for virtualisation control), Kubernetes (container system), Longhorn (for storage control) og Multus CNI (network control).

See also
 Nutanix
 Dell EMC VxRail
 Cisco HyperFlex
 VMware

References

Eksternal links
 Home page: https://harvesterhci.io/
 https://github.com/harvester/

Hyper-converged infrastructures
Free software
Linux software